Alcardo van Graan (born 22 June 1986) is a South African professional footballer, who last played as a forward for South African club Maties and is currently a free agent.

Club career

Early career 

Alcardo van Graan grew up playing at youth level for various clubs around Cape Town, in South Africa's Western Cape, including Idas Valley AFC, Nelsons FC, Maties FC, Battswood FC and Western Province United.

Milano United 
He made his professional debut with Milano United in the 2011-2012 season, where he scored 31 goals for the club from Grassy Park, playing in the Vodacom League, the second tier of professional football in South Africa. Alcardo played a strong season that year, which brought him to the attention of the bigger South African clubs from the PSL, of which Ajax Cape Town signed the young forward.

Ajax Cape Town
Picked up by Ajax CT in the summer of 2012, after an impressive showing the previous season in the Second Division, Alcardo van Graan played in the MTN 8 and scored on his Premier Soccer League debut for Ajax Cape Town. He would go on to make a total of twelve appearances for the Cape club that year, having only found the back of the net once.

On 21 July 2012, during a friendly encounter against his favorite club Manchester United, Alcardo scored the opening goal after his first contact with a lovely backheel touch. Manchester United would eventually level the score with the match ending in a 1-1 draw in Cape Town. When asked about this luck of scoring on his all-time favorite team, Alcardo expressed having to still pinch himself after the match.

Milano United (loan) 
After eight regular season appearances for Ajax CT during the 2012-13 season without scoring, Alcardo was loaned back to the club from which they recruited him on 4 February 2013, for the remainder of the season.

Maties 

In 2014 van Graan represented Stellenbosch University. He played in the Nedbank Cup.

References

1986 births
Living people
Milano United F.C. players
Cape Town Spurs F.C. players
Sportspeople from Cape Town
South African soccer players
Cape Coloureds
South African people of Dutch descent
Association football forwards